Purple Hearts is a 1984 war film directed by Sidney J. Furie and starring Ken Wahl and Cheryl Ladd. The screenplay concerns a Navy surgeon and a Navy nurse who fall in love while serving in Vietnam during the war. Their affection for one another provides a striking contrast to the violence of warfare.

Cast
 Ken Wahl as Don Jardian
 Cheryl Ladd as Deborah Solomon
 Stephen Lee as "Wizard"
 Annie McEnroe as Hallaway
 Paul McCrane as Brenner
 Cyril O'Reilly as Zuma
 David Harris as Hanes
 Hillary Bailey as Jill
 R. Lee Ermey as Gunnery  Sergeant "Gunny"
 Drew Snyder as Lieutenant Colonel Larimore
 Lane Smith as Commander Markel
 James Whitmore Jr. as Bwana
 Kevin Elders as CIA Driver
 Sydney Squire as Nurse
 David Bass as Lieutenant Grayson
 Rudy Nash as Hartman

References

External links

1984 films
Films set in Vietnam
Vietnam War films
Films directed by Sidney J. Furie
Films scored by Robert Folk
The Ladd Company films
Films shot in the Philippines
1980s English-language films
American war films
American romance films
1980s American films